Kaber is a village and civil parish in the Eden District of Cumbria, England.

Location and topography

Until the latest boundary changes Kaber was situated in the historic county of Westmorland.

The place-name 'Kaber' is first attested in the Register of the Priory of Wetherhal, circa 1195, where it appears as Kaberge. The name means 'jackdaw hill'.

The northern boundary of the civil parish is formed by the River Belah which rises near Kaber Fell to the southeast and flows just north of the village en route to joining the River Eden.

The population taken at the 2011 Census was less than 100. Parish record details are maintained in the adjacent parish of Winton.

See also

Listed buildings in Kaber, Cumbria

References

External links
 Cumbria County History Trust: Kaber (nb: provisional research only – see Talk page)

Villages in Cumbria
Civil parishes in Cumbria